Fu Hao died c. 1200 BC, posthumous temple name Mu Xin (母辛), was one of the many wives of King Wu Ding of the Shang dynasty and also served as a military general and high priestess. Minimal evidence detailing Fu Hao's life and military achievements survived the Shang Dynasty, and the records may have perished over the course of time.

The Tomb of Fu Hao was unearthed intact at Yinxu by archaeologist Zheng Zhenxiang, with treasures such as bronzes and jades. The tomb of Fu Hao provides the most insight into her life, her relationship with the royal family, and her military role and achievements - as the objects she was buried with provide clues to her activities and interests.

Biography
What is known is that King Wu Ding cultivated the allegiance of neighbouring tribes by marrying one woman from each of them. Fu Hao (who was believed to be one of the king's 64 wives) entered the royal household through such a marriage and took advantage of the semi-matriarchal slave society to rise through the ranks to become one of King Wu Ding's three consorts. The other two were Fu Jing (婦妌) and Fu Shi (婦嬕) Fu Jing was the primary queen while Fu Hao was the secondary queen. Fu Hao was also the mother of Prince Zu Ji (祖己). Oracle bone inscriptions show concern for her well-being at the time of the birth.

The activities of priestess and ritual matters of China only exist in the Shang dynasty, so some evidence is vague. Since each Chinese Character like Fu 婦 often has variable meanings, even with the oracle bones of Shang deciphered, it is possible that some women like Fu Hao were originally priestess instead of the King's wife; she just happened to marry the King later.  That is to say, the meaning of "wife" in some contexts may actually refer to a position as priestess.

Fu Hao owned her land. According to the oracle bones, she offered the King remarkably valuable tributes many times. Although the Shang king had control over ritual matters, which constituted the most important political activity of the day, oracle bone inscriptions show that Wu Ding repeatedly instructed Fu Hao to conduct the most special rituals and to offer sacrifices to the ancestors.  The Shang Dynasty had two most important activities: ritual matters and battles; Lady Hao played extraordinary roles in both at that time.

Military role 
Fu Hao is known to modern scholars mainly from inscriptions on Shang dynasty oracle bone artifacts unearthed at Yinxu. From these inscriptions and from the presence of weapons in her tomb, it can be determined that Fu Hao was a general in charge of several military campaigns for the Shang Dynasty.

In her military role, she was responsible for conquering enemies and neighbours of the Shang Dynasty. The Tu-Fang had fought against the Shang for generations until they were finally defeated by Fu Hao in a single decisive battle. Further campaigns against the neighbouring Yi, Qiang and Ba followed; the latter is particularly remembered for being the earliest recorded large-scale ambush in Chinese history. With up to 13,000 soldiers and important generals Zhi and Hou Gao serving under her, she was the most powerful Shang general of her time.

This highly unusual status is confirmed by the many weapons, including great battle-axes, unearthed in her tomb.

While Fu Hao's achievements were notable and unique, other women in this period were also active in military roles; in a similar manner Fu Jing was also thought to have served in the military based on the presence of many weapons and military equipment in her tomb. Oracle bones also revealed records of at least six hundred women participating in the military during this era.

Tomb

Remarkably, after her death Fu Hao was buried in a tomb on her land across the river from the main royal cemetery, even though usually the royal families were buried together. She died well in advance of King Wu Ding, who constructed her tomb at his capital Yin.

Because of its location, Lady Hao's tomb is the only royal Shang tomb to have been left unnoticed and unlooted, giving unique insights into her life and the burial practices of the time.  The King later made many sacrifices there in hopes of receiving her spiritual assistance in defeating the attacking Gong, who threatened to wipe out the Shang completely. This shows his great favor towards Hao and after her death, he had her married to the three greatest kings before him. The tomb was unearthed by archaeologists in 1976 and is now open to the public.

The tomb itself was only a  pit that contains a smaller, and  wooden structure within. The inside was packed with burial sacrifices and wealth which signified Lady Hao's prodigious position.

She was buried with a large and varied quantity of weapons signifying her important martial status, since only warriors and generals were buried with such objects. Additionally, Fu Hao was entombed with hundreds of bronze, jade, bone, and stone objects such as figurines, vessels, and mirrors many of them rare objects from around the kingdom. These objects are some of the best preserved we have from that time period. The sacrificial bronze vessels and tortoise shells inscribed prepared by Fu Hao discovered in her tomb are further evidence of her status as a high priestess and oracle caster. As was the custom during the Shang Dynasty, Fu Hao was buried with 16 human sacrifices and six dogs. The remains of Fu Hao herself were found to have disintegrated.

Contents of tomb 
In total, Fu Hao was buried with: 
 	
 755 jade objects
 564 bone objects, including nearly 500 bone hairpins and over 20 bone arrowheads
 468 bronze objects, including 130 weapons, 23 bells, 27 knives, 4 mirrors, and 4 tigers or tiger heads
 63 stone objects
 5 ivory objects
 11 pottery objects
 6,900 pieces of cowry shell (that Shang used as currency)
 16 human sacrifices
 6 dogs

See also 
Tomb of Fu Hao
Women in ancient and imperial China
 Shang dynasty

Note

References

Sources

Further reading
  

Chinese women in politics
13th-century BC Chinese women
13th-century BC Chinese people
13th-century BC clergy
Shang dynasty people
Chinese nobility
Women in ancient Chinese warfare
Ancient priestesses
Chinese female generals
Deaths in childbirth
Chinese royal consorts
1200s BC deaths
Year of birth unknown
Year of death uncertain